The following radio stations broadcast on AM frequency 970 kHz: 970 AM is a regional broadcast frequency.

In Argentina 
 LRA43 Neuquén, Neuquén
 LT25 in Curuzú Cuatiá, Corrientes

In Mexico 
 XECJ-AM in Apatzingán, Michoacán
 XEJ-AM in Cd. Juárez, Chihuahua
 XERFR-AM in Mexico City, DF
 XEUG-AM in Guanajuato, Guanajuato

In the United States

In Uruguay 
 CX 22 Radio Universal in Montevideo

References

Lists of radio stations by frequency